John Rudometkin (June 6, 1940 – August 4, 2015) was an American professional basketball player, formerly of the New York Knicks and San Francisco Warriors in the National Basketball Association (NBA). He was selected in the second round as the 11th pick in the 1962 NBA draft by the Knicks and spent three seasons playing in the league. Rudometkin was nicknamed "the Reckless Russian" by Chick Hearn, the Los Angeles Lakers broadcaster who used to broadcast USC men's basketball games before transitioning to the NBA.

College
Before attending the University of Southern California, Rudometkin spent one year playing basketball at Allan Hancock College, a junior college located in his hometown of Santa Maria, California. He averaged 18.2 points per game (ppg) in 30 games during the 1958–59 season.

Rudometkin then enrolled at USC in the fall of 1959 to play for the Trojans. As a  center, he went on to have a highly successful career in college. In his three varsity seasons at the NCAA Division I institution, Rudometkin held career averages of 18.8 points and 10.5 rebounds in 79 games played. He scored 1,434 points, which stood as the school record for 23 years, and his 18.8 average is still the best career average at USC. In 1961, he led the Trojans to an outright conference title, which through 2009–10 remains their most recent outright conference championship. In all three seasons Rudometkin led the team in scoring and was named the team MVP, and as a senior in 1961–62 he was named a consensus second-team All-American.

Professional
After his college career ended, Rudometkin was selected in the second round as the 11th overall pick by the New York Knicks in the 1962 NBA draft. Although Rudometkin played the center position in college, he was moved to play forward in the NBA. In three professional seasons, Rudometkin averaged 6.3 points, 3.1 rebounds and 0.5 assists per game.

Personal
After only three seasons, Rudometkin was forced to prematurely retire from basketball. His stamina weakened noticeably and doctors could not initially determine the cause.  He was diagnosed with non-Hodgkin's lymphoma, a diverse group of blood cancers that include any kind of lymphoma except Hodgkin's lymphoma. He spent years in treatment, which caused total hair loss, temporary paralysis and the need to learn to walk all over again. Rudometkin eventually went into remission and cited both medicine and his faith as reasons why he was able to survive the tumor which had encircled his lungs and heart.

After his ordeal, Rudometkin married, had three sons, wrote a book about his experiences and traveled the country as a motivational speaker. He also spent time as a real estate investor and minister. Towards the end of his life, he resided in Newcastle, California with his wife of roughly 50 years, and required an oxygen tank to help him breathe. Rudometkin died on August 4, 2015 from chronic lung disease.

References

1940 births
2015 deaths
All-American college men's basketball players
Allan Hancock Bulldogs men's basketball players
American men's basketball players
American people of Russian descent
Basketball players from California
New York Knicks draft picks
New York Knicks players
Parade High School All-Americans (boys' basketball)
People from Newcastle, California
San Francisco Warriors players
Small forwards
Sportspeople from Santa Maria, California
USC Trojans men's basketball players